Lakki may refer to:
 Lakki, Chabahar
 Lakki, Konarak